The 2015 Oceania Rugby Cup for national rugby union teams in the Oceania region was held in Papua New Guinea at the Lloyd Robson Oval in Port Moresby in August 2015.  won the title by finishing on top of the table after completing the round-robin tournament undefeated.

Teams
Participating nations for the 2015 tournament were:

Standings

Matches

Round 1

Round 2

Round 3

See also
 Oceania Rugby Cup

Reference list

2015
2015 rugby union tournaments for national teams
2015 in Oceanian rugby union
2015 in American Samoan sports
2015 in French Polynesian sport
2015 in Cook Islands sport
2015 in New Caledonian sport
2015 in Niue
2015 in Papua New Guinean sport
2015 in Solomon Islands sport
2015 in Vanuatuan sport
International rugby union competitions hosted by Papua New Guinea